The North Branch Reformed Church is a historic church located on the eastern side of the North Branch of the Raritan River in North Branch, New Jersey at 203 New Jersey Route 28.  It was formed by expansion from the Readington Reformed Church. The church was organized on September 10, 1825. The first church was built in 1826 and later rebuilt in 1874.

The North Branch Reformed Church Cemetery is located nearby on the western side of the North Branch along Vanderveer Avenue. It is on the old farm of the Ten Eyck family, where about one acre was sold to the church .

Notable burials
 Jacob Ten Eyck ( – ), son of Matthias Ten Eyck (1658–1741) from Old Hurley, Ulster County, New York
 Jacob Ten Eyck ( – ),  son of Jacob Ten Eyck (1693–1753), a captain in the American Revolutionary War
 Raymond Bateman (1927–2016), Somerset County politician

See also
North Branch Historic District
Readington Reformed Church

References

External links

Bridgewater Township, New Jersey
Reformed Church in America churches in New Jersey
Cemeteries in Somerset County, New Jersey
Churches in Somerset County, New Jersey
19th-century Reformed Church in America church buildings
Religious organizations established in 1825